Saint Stephen is a city in Stearns County, Minnesota, United States. The population was 851 at the 2010 census.

Saint Stephen is part of the Saint Cloud Metropolitan Statistical Area.

History
St. Stephen was incorporated in 1914.  The city contains one property listed on the National Register of Historic Places: the 1903 Church of St. Stephen and its 1890 rectory.

Geography

Main routes include Stearns County Roads 2 and 5.  Stearns County Roads 1 and 17 are both nearby.

Demographics

2010 census
As of the census of 2010, there were 851 people, 305 households, and 234 families living in the city. The racial makeup of the city was 99.1% White, 0.1% Native American, 0.1% Pacific Islander, and 0.7% from two or more races. Hispanic or Latino of any race were 0.7% of the population.

There were 305 households, of which 42.0% had children under the age of 18 living with them, 65.9% were married couples living together, 6.2% had a female householder with no husband present, 4.6% had a male householder with no wife present, and 23.3% were non-families. 17.7% of all households were made up of individuals, and 6.2% had someone living alone who was 65 years of age or older. The average household size was 2.79 and the average family size was 3.19.

The median age in the city was 36.4 years. 30.1% of residents were under the age of 18; 6.3% were between the ages of 18 and 24; 28.4% were from 25 to 44; 23.9% were from 45 to 64; and 11.2% were 65 years of age or older. The gender makeup of the city was 51.6% male and 48.4% female.

2000 census
As of the census of 2000, there were 860 people, 289 households, and 238 families living in the city. The racial makeup of the city was 99.07% White, and 0.93% from two or more races. Hispanic or Latino of any race were 1.05% of the population.

There were 289 households, out of which 51.2% had children under the age of 18 living with them, 73.7% were married couples living together, 4.2% had a female householder with no husband present, and 17.6% were non-families. 14.2% of all households were made up of individuals, and 4.8% had someone living alone who was 65 years of age or older.  The average household size was 2.98 and the average family size was 3.31.

In the city, the population was spread out, with 32.9% under the age of 18, 7.0% from 18 to 24, 38.0% from 25 to 44, 15.0% from 45 to 64, and 7.1% who were 65 years of age or older.  The median age was 31 years. For every 100 females, there were 108.2 males.  For every 100 females age 18 and over, there were 106.1 males.

The median income for a household in the city was $55,078, and the median income for a family was $56,328. Males had a median income of $34,740 versus $25,313 for females. The per capita income for the city was $20,445.  About 1.7% of families and 2.8% of the population were below the poverty line, including 2.6% of those under age 18 and 5.1% of those age 65 or over.

Education
Saint Stephen is part of the Sartell-Saint Stephen School District 748.

References

External links
Official Website

Cities in Stearns County, Minnesota
Cities in Minnesota
St. Cloud, Minnesota metropolitan area